Sherkat-e Gol Nama (also Romanized as Sherkat-e Gol Namā) is a village in Taraznahid Rural District, in the Central District of Saveh County, Markazi Province, Iran. At the 2006 census, its population was 50, in 15 families.

References 

Populated places in Saveh County